The 1963 Canada Cup took place 24–28 October at Golf de Saint-Nom-la-Bretèche in Saint-Nom-la-Bretèche, 30 km west of Paris, France. It was the 11th Canada Cup event, which became the World Cup in 1967. The tournament was a 72-hole stroke play team event with 33 teams, but was shortened to 63 holes. These were the same teams that had competed in 1962 but without Ecuador and Panama and with the addition of Austria. Each team consisted of two players from a country. The combined score of each team determined the team results. Thick fog meant that play was abandoned on the planned final day. Play was extended to Monday but was restricted to 9 holes. The American team of Jack Nicklaus and Arnold Palmer won by three strokes over the Spanish team of Sebastián Miguel and Ramón Sota.  This was the sixth team title for the United States in the 11-year history of the event and the fourth in a row. The individual competition was won by Jack Nicklaus, who finished five shots ahead of Sebastián Miguel and South African Gary Player.

Teams

Source

Scores
Team

International Trophy

Source

References

World Cup (men's golf)
Golf tournaments in France
Canada Cup
Canada Cup
Canada Cup